The Chinese Widow, also known as In Harm's Way and The Hidden Soldier, is a 2017 Chinese war drama film directed by Danish director Bille August, starring Liu Yifei and Emile Hirsch. The film premiered at the 2017 Shanghai International Film Festival as the opening film and was released on 10 November 2017 in mainland China.

Plot
Jack is an American Air Force pilot with a mission to carry out the first US bombing run on Tokyo. After the mission is successful, his plane gets detached from the rest of the squadron due to bad weather. With low fuel, he is forced to go to China's Zhejiang Province. Due to malfunctioning autopilot, he is forced to fly the plane manually while his crew parachutes out and he jumps out in the last moment before the plane crashes.

The next day, his unconscious body is discovered by a local widow named Ying, who lives with her daughter Nunu weaving silk. She hides him in a nearby cave with the help of her childhood friend and village head Kai. Soon after, the Imperial Japanese Army (who already have captured and executed the rest of Jack's crew) come in search of Jack and capture the village, holding Kai at gunpoint to tell where the pilot is hiding. Kai refuses to do so and is executed. Nunu insists Ying to tell what she knows to her grandparents but Ying does not, remembering Kai's advice not to tell it to anyone. The next day, she goes to the cave with some food and seeing Jack conscious, leaves it there and returns promptly before he can confront her.

The Japanese army sends search patrols in the jungle and Ying is forced to bring Jack into her house. Although distant at first, Jack quickly befriends Nunu by whistling Yankee Doodle to her. Jack is able to convey to Ying that he has to go to Chongqing where the US Army base is. She hides him in the basement, while she tries to find a way to contact the Chinese guerrillas to get him a safe passage. One day, while Nunu is in her school, the IJA Captain Shimamoto comes into Ying's house and attempts to rape her, only to be shot in the head by Jack. They hide the body in the basement and as Jack consoles Ying, they form an intimate bond.

In school, Nunu accidentally  whistles Yankee Doodle which is noticed by her teacher. The teacher then rushes to Ying's house with Nunu and on confronting Jack, reveals that he is with the Chinese guerrillas. When Jack shows him the Captain's body, he tells Ying and Nunu to escape along with Jack, as the IJA will execute them once they find out. While they make their escape, the IJA find the body and pursue the group after torching the village. The Japanese eventually catch up and fire on them, and the teacher stays behind with a few guerrillas to slow them down, and is killed. With the group only a few metres away from the escape boat, Ying is shot in the chest by a sniper. Devastated, Jack kills the sniper and barely escapes with Nunu and the remaining guerrillas.

In Chongqing, he reports to General Jimmy Doolittle, also expressing his wish to adopt Nunu. The General rejects it by saying that Jack cannot be a soldier and her father at the same time. Instead, Nunu will be given to a Chinese family living in Los Angeles. Jack reluctantly accepts and bids Nunu a tearful goodbye. 50 years later, an elderly Jack writes a letter to a grown-up Nunu saying that he was truly in love with her mother and despite missing her everyday, he has come to peace with himself. The address on the envelope in which Jack inserts the letter indicates Nunu is at a San Diego, California address.

Cast
Liu Yifei as Ying
Emile Hirsch as Jack
Li Fangcong as Nunu
Yan Yikuan as Kai
Yu Shaoqun as teacher
Tsukagoshi Hirotaka as Captain Shimamoto
Vincent Riotta as Jimmy Doolittle
Gong Hanlin as Ying's father-in-law
Jin Zhu as Ying's mother-in-law
Gallen Lo as Captain Xu
Gong Tiankuo as Lieutenant Sun
Shu Yaoxuan as hawker
Vivian Wu as elderly Nunu (the character did not appear in the final cut of the film but was credited with a special acknowledgment).

Release
The film was released in China (10 November 2017), the United States (2 November 2018) and France (14 November 2018). In France, the film was released with an alternative English-language title: The Lost Soldier.

Awards and nominations
Nominated - Golden Goblet Award for Best Feature Film

See also
 Doolittle Raid
 Pearl Harbor (film)

References

External links
 
 
 

2017 films
2017 romantic drama films
2017 war drama films
Chinese war drama films
Chinese romantic drama films
Films set in Zhejiang
Films directed by Bille August
Romantic epic films
Chinese World War II films
Second Sino-Japanese War films
Films about the Doolittle Raid